Blue Line International was a ferry company owned by the Croatia-based SEM Maritime Company (SMC).  The Blue Line brand was established in 2003 as a marketing name for SMC's Croatia—Italy services, coinciding with the purchase of the MV Ancona.

The company operated a regular around-the-year service between Ancona and Split, alongside the seasonal lines Ancona—Hvar and Ancona—Vis.

References

 Fakta om Fartyg: SEM Maritime Company / Blue Ferries

External links

 Blue Line International web page

Shipping companies of Croatia
Water transport in Croatia
Ferry companies of Croatia